Leah is a feminine given name of Hebrew origin. Its meaning is often deciphered as "delicate" or "weary". The name can be traced back to the Biblical matriarch Leah, one of the two wives of Jacob.

The name is the origin of the Ashkenazi Jewish matronymic surname Leykin/Leikin/Leikind .

Variants

Lea – Croatian, Danish, Dutch, Estonian, Finnish, Hungarian,  Norwegian, Serbian, Slovene, Swedish, Polish, Yoruba
Léa – French
Leah – English, Hebrew
Leia – Koine Greek
Lėja – Lithuanian
Lia – Ecclesiastical Latin, Italian, Portuguese, Romanian, German
Lía – Galician
Liadh – Irish
Liah
Lya
Λεία (Lia) – Greek
Liia – Estonian
Lija – Latvian
Liya

Royalty
Leah Isadora Behn, the second daughter of Princess Märtha Louise of Norway

Public figures
Leah Manning (1886–1977), British activist and politician
Leah Rabin (1928–2000), wife of Israeli Prime Minister Yitzhak Rabin
Leah Rosenthal (1879–1930), Australian nurse who served in World War I
Leah Ward Sears (born 1955), American judge

Arts and sports
Leah Applebaum, American voice actress
Leah Ayres (born 1957), American actress
Leah Baird (1883–1971), American actress
Leah Betts (1977–1995), British water intoxication / ecstasy victim 
Leah Bracknell (1964–2019), British actress
Leah Cairns (born 1974), Canadian actress
Leah Cherniak (born 1956), Canadian playwright and theatre director
Leah Clark (born 1979), American voice actress affiliated with Funimation
Leah Dizon (born 1986), American-born Japanese model and singer
Leah Fortune (born 1990), Brazilian-American football (soccer) player
Leah Goldberg (1911–1970), Israeli writer
Leah Goldstein (born 1969), Israeli cyclist
Lea Gottlieb (1918–2012), Israeli fashion designer
Leah Haywood (born 1976), Australian singer
Leah Horowitz (runner) (1933–1956), Israeli Olympic hurdler
Leah Kaslar (born 1985), Australian rules footballer
Leah Krinsky, American comedy writer
Leah Laiman (born 1946), American writer 
Leah McHenry (born 1984), Canadian musician and music educator
Leah Miller (born 1981), Canadian actress
Leah Moore (born 1978), British comic book writer
Leah Neuberger (1915–1993), American table tennis player
Leah Pells (born 1964), Canadian track and field athlete
Leah Pinsent (born 1968), Canadian actress
Leah Pipes (born 1988), American actress
Leah Purcell (born 1970), Australian actress
Leah Remini, American actress
Leah Rhodes (1902–1986), American costume designer
Léa Seydoux (born 1985), French actress
Leah Song, American musician and activist
Leah Van Dale (born 1987), American professional wrestler better known as Carmella
Leah Williamson (born 1997), English footballer

Others
 Leah Berman (born 1976), American mathematician
Leah Chase (1923–2019), American chef
 Leah Findlater, Canadian and American computer scientist
Leah Horowitz (1680–1755), Polish scholar and writer
Leah Mosher, pilot in the Royal Canadian Air Force
Lia (stage name), member of ITZY

Fictional characters 
Leah, in the British radio series The Space Gypsy Adventures
Leah, in the American animated TV series Shimmer and Shine
Leah, in the 2018 TV series The Crossing
Leah, in the American TV series The Walking Dead
Leah, in the 2018 movie Love, Simon
Leah Murphy, in the American medical drama TV series Grey's Anatomy
Leye (ashkenazic pronunciation), in the play The Dybbuk
Queen Leah, mother of Princess Aurora in Disney's 1959 animated film Sleeping Beauty
Leia Organa, from the Star Wars Saga
Leah Brahms, in the TV series Star Trek: The Next Generation
Leah Clearwater, in the Twilight novels by Stephenie Meyer
Leah Estrogen, in the 2001 film Osmosis Jones
Leah Mordecai, title character of the 1856 novel by Belle K. Abbott
Leah Patterson-Baker, in the Australian TV series Home and Away
Leah Rose, in the Left Behind novels by Tim LaHaye and Jerry Jenkins
Leah Kazuno, one of the two members of Saint Snow
Leah Rilke, in the TV series The Wilds.

See also
Lea (given name)

References

English feminine given names
Feminine given names
Hebrew feminine given names